Wohlthat Mountains is a large group of associated mountain features consisting of the Humboldt Mountains, Petermann Ranges, and the Gruber Mountains, located immediately east of the Orvin Mountains in Fimbulheimen in the central Queen Maud Land. Discovered by the Third German Antarctic Expedition (1938–1939), led by Capt. Alfred Ritscher, and named for Councilor of state Helmuth C.H. Wohlthat, who as economist and fiscal officer dealt with the organization of the expedition.

The area was reconnoitered and aerially photographed by the 5th Indian Antarctic Expedition (Nov 1985-Mar 1986) with a three-month temporary summer camp established there. The area was revisited by later Indian Antarctic expeditions.

Astor Rocks
They were plotted from air photos and from surveys by the Sixth Norwegian Antarctic Expedition (NorAE), 1956–60, and named for Astor Ernstsen, a meteorologist with the NorAE, 1958–59.

See also
Maud Subglacial Basin, situated southward of the Wohlthat Mountains

References

External links

Mountain ranges of Queen Maud Land
Princess Astrid Coast